Larry Faircloth may refer to:

 Larry V. Faircloth, West Virginia politician
 Larry W. Faircloth, member of the West Virginia House of Delegates and son of Larry V. Faircloth